The 2020 Sacramento mayoral election was held on March 3, 2020 to elect the mayor of Sacramento, California. It saw the reelection of Darrell Steinberg. Since Steinberg won a majority in the first round, no runoff was required.

Municipal elections in California are officially non-partisan.

Results

References 

Sacramento
Mayoral elections in Sacramento, California
Sacramento